Nojoqui Falls is a seasonal waterfall in the Santa Barbara County, California park of the same name.

Description 
Nojoqui has been described as “one of the most graceful waterfalls in California” and “the highlight of the scenic drive along U.S. 101 between the coast and Solvang.”

The falls drop nearly 100 feet over a sandstone wall of the Jalama Formation.

From the sign posted near the falls: "Unlike most waterfalls, which gradually erode upstream, the Nojoqui Falls have built outward from the cliff over time. Calcium and magnesium carbonate from rocks above the falls continually dissolve in the stream water, then are deposited as this water evaporates from the rock around the falls. Stalactites in a cave grow in the same slow manner, and are made of the same type of rock, called travertine. Grooves in the main travertine deposit and a gently curved notch at the base of the falls have formed where the rock has dissolved once again into the stream."

The waterfall is rainfall-dependent and “usually dries up in summer.”

Location 

The falls are located one and a half miles east of Highway 101 approximately five miles south of Buellton and about 7 miles southwest of the city of Solvang via Alisal Road.

The falls are at the end of a short trail south of the parking lot. Access to the falls themselves has been blocked since 2014 due to landslides.

External links
 Santa Barbara County Parks Department: Nojoqui Falls Park
 World Of Waterfalls: Nojoqui Falls
  Central Coast Tourist: Nojoqui Falls

References

Waterfalls of California
Horsetail waterfalls
Landforms of Santa Barbara County, California
Parks in Santa Barbara County, California
Santa Ynez Mountains